Open 24 Hours is a 2018 horror film written and directed by Padraig Reynolds.

Plot
After setting her serial killer boyfriend, James Lincolnfields, the "Rain Ripper" on fire, a paranoid delusional woman, named Mary, gets a job at a 24-hr gas station. Mary is forced as a condition of her parole to work, and because she cannot find work elsewhere, agrees to work the 10 pm to 6 am night shift at Deer Gas Market. Mary tells her childhood friend, Debbie, that her boyfriend would call her on the phone whenever it rained and play "Raindrops" by Dee Clark, and would thereafter or during, murder someone. Mary was nicknamed "The Watcher" by the press as she watched some of the 35 victims of her boyfriend being murdered. She suffers from repeated hallucinations of James, who is in prison, which she controls with medication.

On her first shift, she meets fellow colleague Bobby who shows her her duties. He leaves along with Debbie who is struck by a hammer in her car by a hooded assailant and dragged away. A sleazy trucker arrives and attempts to hit on Mary, and deliberately leaves his credit card behind as an excuse to return.
Mary begins to receive mysterious phone calls from a woman asking her when they close. A young couple then arrive to buy alcohol and the girl uses the outside toilet and tells Mary it's out of order. Going to check, she finds Debbie's drivers license in the bowl and then the toilet fills with blood and arms break through the wall behind her attempting to grab her, but it is just another hallucination. She attempts to call her parole officer Tom, but cannot get through.

Bobby returns to check on her and she tells him her story of how she found the dead girls in her basement, and how James kept her prisoner, forcing her to watch him kill his victims. Bobby then leaves, but his truck breaks down, and whilst trying to fix it, he is struck on the back of the head with a hammer by the hooded assailant.

James arrives and claims to be real, telling her people will die and she will watch it, but Mary disproves it as she was hallucinating again and it was just a woman arriving to buy gas, however Mary recognises her voice as the voice on the phone, and the woman reveals herself to be the mother of James's last victim and attacks her with a knife, trying to escape, she runs to the back room where Bobby and Debbie are both tied to chairs, but Tom arrives and shoots her in the head, saving Mary and informing her of a prison break in which James escaped. James then appears behind Tom and knocks him out.

James ties Mary to a chair and forces her to watch as he brutally caves in Tom's skull with a sledgehammer and then suffocates Debbie with a plastic bag, he douses Bobby with petrol and just as he is about to immolate him, the trucker from earlier returns, but he calls the police when he notices signs of a disturbance. James leaves the room to investigate.

Mary is able to free herself and unties Bobby, who tells her that a fellow employee keeps a shotgun in his locker, she is able to retrieve and load it, and they wait for James to return in order to kill him. The trucker makes his way towards the back room, but is impaled through the neck with a hammer by James, and is then shot by Mary when she mistakes him for James. Bobby and Mary then leave the back room with the shotgun, but James cuts the power and kills Bobby with the hammer.

Meanwhile a lone police officer arrives and Mary rushes outside and into his car, but James appears and murders the officer with the shotgun. Mary escapes through the woods and happens upon an old auto plant. James stalks her, but she bludgeons him with an iron bar and runs away.

Returning to the gas station, she locks herself in the office and notices a deer's head on the wall. James breaks the door down and she impales him with the antlers. She slumps down against the desk and James crawls in and proclaims his love to her before he dies, however when she wakes later, James has gone. She then leaves the gas station.

Mary is next seen at a new job in a hairdressers. As she is sweeping up, she hears a noise outside. As she looks up, the screen cuts to black.

Production
An international co-production film between Canada and Serbia. The film was screened at the 2018 Fantastic Fest.

Reception

References

External links

2018 horror films
Canadian horror films
Serbian horror films
English-language Serbian films
2010s English-language films
Films directed by Padraig Reynolds
2010s Canadian films